Juan Chabás (September 10, 1900, Dénia – October 29, 1954) was a Spanish-born poet and writer. He was a member of the influential group of writers known as the Generation of '27. He fled to exile in Cuba following the Spanish Civil War.

In 1938, he met French journalist Simone Téry, whom he married in 1938.  They would later divorce. 

Juan Chabás died of a heart attack at age 44 in Santiago de Cuba and is buried in the Colon Cemetery, Havana.

Works 
 Espejos 1919-verso-1920 (1921),
 Sin velas desvelada, (1927),
 Puerto de sombra, (1928),
 Italia fascista (1929),
 Vuelo y estilo (1930),
 Agor sin fin, (1930),
 Historia de la literatura española (1932),
 Literatura española contemporánea (1898–1950) (1952),
 Fábula y vida, (1955),
 Árbol de ti nacido (1956).

References 

1910 births
1954 deaths
People from Marina Alta
Republican Left (Spain) politicians
Communist Party of Spain politicians
Generation of '27
20th-century Spanish poets
Spanish male poets
Writers from the Valencian Community
Spanish military personnel of the Spanish Civil War (Republican faction)
Exiles of the Spanish Civil War in Cuba